Roth Creek (also known as Bachelor Creek) is a stream in Franklin County in the U.S. state of Missouri.
 
Roth Creek was named after a local landowner.

See also
List of rivers of Missouri

References

Rivers of Franklin County, Missouri
Rivers of Missouri